The Rio Star is a cantilevered observation wheel in the Santo Cristo neighborhood, located in the city of Rio de Janeiro, Brazil. It is Latin America's tallest cantilevered observation wheel.

References

External links

 
 
 

Ferris wheels
Amusement rides introduced in 2019
Buildings and structures in Rio de Janeiro (city)
2019 establishments in Brazil